Schilbe is a genus of schilbid catfishes native to Africa. Some are colloquially called butter catfish, though this may also refer to the Asian genus Ompok of the family Siluridae.

Species
There are currently 21 recognized species in this genus:
 Schilbe angolensis (De Vos, 1984)
 Schilbe banguelensis (Boulenger, 1911) (Golden Barbel)
 Schilbe bocagii (Guimarães, 1884)
 Schilbe brevianalis (Pellegrin, 1929)
 Schilbe congensis (Leach, 1818)
 Schilbe djeremi (Thys van den Audenaerde & De Vos, 1982)
 Schilbe durinii (Gianferrari, 1932)
 Schilbe grenfelli (Boulenger, 1900)
 Schilbe intermedius Rüppell, 1832 (Silver Butter Catfish)
 Schilbe laticeps (Boulenger, 1899)
 Schilbe mandibularis (Günther, 1867)
 Schilbe marmoratus Boulenger, 1911 (Shoulderspot Catfish)
 Schilbe micropogon (Trewavas, 1943)
 Schilbe moebiusii (Pfeffer, 1896)
 Schilbe multitaeniatus (Pellegrin, 1913)
 Schilbe mystus (Linnaeus, 1758) (African Butter Catfish)
 Schilbe nyongensis (De Vos, 1981)
 Schilbe tumbanus (Pellegrin, 1926)
 Schilbe uranoscopus Rüppell, 1832
 Schilbe yangambianus (Poll, 1954) (Yangambi Butterbarbel)
 Schilbe zairensis De Vos, 1995

References

 
Schilbeidae

Freshwater fish genera
Catfish genera
Taxa named by Lorenz Oken
Taxonomy articles created by Polbot